Nikos Vamvakoulas (born 31 January 1957) is a Greek retired football defender.

Career
Born in Lavrio, Vamvakoulas played club football for Olympiacos, Panathinaikos, Ionikos, OFI Crete and PAS Giannina. He won four Alpha Ethniki and one Greek Football Cup titles with Olympiacos before he won two more Alpha Ethniki and three more Greek Football Cup titles with Panathinaikos.

Vamvakoulas made 30 appearances for the Greece national football team from 1981 to 1987.

Also he has written the hymn of Olympiacos.

Honours

Club
Olympiacos
Greek Championship: 1981, 1982, 1983
Greek Cup: 1981

Panathinaikos
Greek Championship: 1986
Greek Cup: 1986, 1988, 1989

References

External links

 

1957 births
Living people
Greek footballers
Greece international footballers
Association football defenders
Olympiacos F.C. players
Panathinaikos F.C. players
Ionikos F.C. players
OFI Crete F.C. players
PAS Giannina F.C. players
Greek beach soccer players
People from East Attica
Footballers from Attica